The Hulett Farm is a historic farmstead on United States Route 7 in Wallingford, Vermont.  Its principal surviving element is a c. 1810 Federal period farmhouse, which is one of the oldest surviving farmhouses in rural southern Wallingford.  The property was listed on the National Register of Historic Places in 1986.

Description and history
The house, which is the only major surviving element of the farmstead, is a -story wood-frame structure, with a gable roof and a saltbox profile. The main facade faces west (toward the road), and is a symmetrical five bays, with a center entrance framed by wide sidelight windows and topped by an entablature and cornice. The saltbox extension to the rear is a 20th-century addition. Located southwest of the house is a small single-story wood-frame shed with a double-leaf door. The farmstead used to include a c. 1920s chicken coop, located north of the house, and a c. 1850 barn, located across the street;

The Hulett Farm was established in the early 19th century, and its house is one of only two in southern Wallingford that follows a typical Georgian plan.  The Federal period sidelights are extremely unusual because of their two-pane width.

See also
National Register of Historic Places listings in Rutland County, Vermont

References

Farms on the National Register of Historic Places in Vermont
Federal architecture in Vermont
Buildings and structures completed in 1810
Buildings and structures in Wallingford, Vermont
National Register of Historic Places in Rutland County, Vermont